Arup Debnath (born 15 July 1987) is an Indian professional footballer who plays as a goalkeeper for Hindustan FC in DSA Senior Division.

Career

Early career
Born in West Bengal, Debnath began his career with the Steel Authority of India before beginning his professional career at East Bengal of the National Football League, However, due to being at the same club as other, more reputable keepers such as Naseem Akhtar, Subrata Pal, and Abhra Mondal, Debnath found playing time hard to come by and thus he decided to sign for Air India FC of the I-League in 2008. After one season with Air India in which Debnath was the club's #1 he decided to move back to East Bengal to try and cement more playing time, however, that was not meant to be and thus he re-signed for Air India before the 2010–11 season. Despite starting in the club's first seven league matches, Debnath had to miss the rest of the season after suffering an injury in a match against Pune F.C. in a collision with Mandjou Keita.

After recovering from his injury Debnath signed for Kenkre F.C. in the I-League 2nd Division for the 2012 season. Then after that Debnath signed for newly founded club Mumbai Tigers for the 2012–13 season. While with Tigers Debnath lead the club to the final of the 2012 Durand Cup where they lost to Debnath's former club Air India.

Pune
On 31 July 2013 it was announced that Debnath had signed with Pune F.C. of the I-League for the 2013–14 season. He made his debut for the club on 6 November 2013 against Bengaluru FC at the Balewadi Sports Complex where he started and kept a clean-sheet as Pune won 1–0.

References

External links 
 
 

1987 births
Living people
Indian footballers
East Bengal Club players
Air India FC players
Mumbai Tigers FC players
Pune FC players
NEROCA FC players
Aizawl FC players
Association football goalkeepers
Footballers from West Bengal
I-League players
I-League 2nd Division players
Mohammedan SC (Kolkata) players
Peerless SC players